Lucius Vinicius may refer to:

 Lucius Vinicius (consul 33 BC), Roman senator
 Lucius Vinicius (consul 5 BC), Roman senator